The 1977 Washington State Cougars football team was an American football team that represented Washington State University in the Pacific-8 Conference (Pac-8) during the 1977 NCAA Division I football season. In their only season under head coach Warren Powers, the Cougars compiled a 6–5 record (3–4 in Pac-8, tied for fourth), and outscored their opponents 263 to 236.

The team's statistical leaders included Jack Thompson with 2,372 passing yards, Dan Doornink with 591 rushing yards, and Mike Levenseller with 736 receiving yards.

The Cougars opened the season with an upset win at fifteenth-ranked Nebraska.

Previously an assistant with the Huskers, Powers left after just twelve months in Pullman for Missouri of the Big Eight Conference. His predecessor in 1976, Jackie Sherrill, also lasted just one season with the Cougars. Offensive backfield coach Jim Walden was promoted to head coach less than a week later, and led the WSU program for nine years.

Schedule

 UCLA later forfeited the game due to fielding an ineligible player.

Roster

NFL Draft
Eight Cougars were selected in the 1978 NFL Draft; Ken Greene was the first player from WSU taken in the first round in thirteen years.

References

External links
 Game program: California at WSU – October 8, 1977
 Game program: UCLA vs. WSU at Spokane – October 15, 1977
 Game program: Oregon at WSU – October 22, 1977
 Game program: Idaho at WSU – November 12, 1977

Washington State
Washington State Cougars football seasons
Washington State Cougars football